The Gate of Supreme Harmony (Möllendorff: amba hūwaliyambure duka) is the second major gate in the south of the Forbidden City in Beijing, China.

The gate was originally built during the Ming dynasty, when it was called Fengtianmen (奉天門). Following the Manchu conquest of China, the gate was given its present Chinese and Manchu names. The gate burned down in 1886 due to a fire started by a tipped lamp in the guard room. The present gate dates from the rebuilding after this fire, which was completed in 1894.

In the Ming dynasty, the Emperor held morning court sessions at the Gate of Supreme Harmony to discuss state affairs with his ministers, although throughout most of the Ming dynasty the court sessions were purely ceremonial, a demonstration of the Emperor's diligence and the status of the titular first minister. In the Qing dynasty, when the Emperor attended court far more frequently, morning court sessions were held at the Gate of Heavenly Purity, which is much closer to the Emperor's living quarters. The Gate of Supreme Harmony was used occasionally for banquets and other ceremonies.

It is flanked by two minor gates, Zhendu Gate to the west and Zhaode Gate to the east. The gate and the Meridian Gate form the north and south boundaries of a great plaza that is divided by a serpentine waterway, the Inner River of the Golden Water, which is spanned by a set of five bridges. On the north (inner) side of the gate is Harmony Square, leading to the grand Hall of Supreme Harmony, the ceremonial centre of the Forbidden City.

Many incense burners are arrayed around the stairs. The central stairway was reserved exclusively for the Emperor and his immediate attendants, as was the central entrance of Meridian Gate.

References

External links

 World heritage immersive panorama - In this panorama your viewpoint will be near a large bronze lion, one of a pair of traditional imperial guardian lions. This female (in appearance much like a male lion) is always to the intruder's left, and is shown playing with a single cub. The male, to the right, will have his left paw on a globe, representing his "feeling the pulse of the earth".

Forbidden City
Gates of Beijing
Ming dynasty architecture
Qing dynasty architecture